The music of Lebanon has a long history. Beirut, the capital city of Lebanon, has long been known, especially in a period immediately following World War II, for its art and intellectualism. Several singers emerged in this period, among the most famous Fairuz, Sabah, Wadih El Safi, Nasri Shamseddine, Melhem Barakat, Majida El Roumi, Ahmad Kaabour, Marcel Khalife (activist folk singer and oud player), and Ziad Rahbani, who—in addition to being an engaged singer-songwriter and music composer—was also a popular playwright. Lydia Canaan was hailed by the media as the first rock star of the Middle East.

During the fifteen-year civil war, most of the Lebanese music stars moved to Cairo or Paris, with a large music scene in Beirut only returning after 1992. Modern pop stars include Najwa Karam, Diana Haddad, Nawal Al Zoghbi, Elissa, Ragheb Alama, Walid Toufic, Wael Kfoury, Fares Karam, Amal Hijazi, Nancy Ajram, Melhem Zein, Fadel Shaker, Assi El Helani, Myriam Fares, and Yara.

The annual Fête de la Musique, held in late June, brings the whole country out for organized and spontaneous underground concerts.

Influence of international popular music in Lebanon
Rock is very popular in Lebanon. During the Lebanese Civil War, rock, hard rock, and heavy metal were very popular. Bands like Deep Purple, Black Sabbath, Led Zeppelin, Rolling Stones, Iron Maiden, and Scorpions were extremely popular. In 1978, Rolling Stones booked a concert in Lebanon which was sold out in five hours. The concert was canceled, causing many Lebanese rock fans to burn tires on roads, blocking it of anger.

During the Lebanese Civil War, Lydia Canaan's initial performances under the stage name Angel were historically unprecedented on more than one front; her career began with her risking her life to perform amidst enemy military attacks, her concerts literally being held in vicinities of Lebanon which were simultaneously being bombed. According to Arabian Woman magazine: "As...A girl who grew up in the midst of a bloody civil war...Canaan was breaking down seemingly insurmountable barriers...She rocked the establishment". As noted by The Gulf Today: "It is incredible that amidst the state of civil war that existed in Lebanon at that time, when most people had no idea if they would see another day, she managed to keep her ambitions alive". Society magazine attests: "In a small country that was ripped by war, there was this young girl making a difference". Concerning Canaan's first concert as Angel, The Gulf Today writes: "The first show produced a phenomenal reaction". Society magazine states: "Tickets were sold out but more teenagers stormed in to see the young Angel perform...To accommodate the crowd, the concert organizers had to stamp on each fan's hand as they ran out of tickets. It was...Her first success".

The underground music scene became vibrant in Lebanon after the end of the civil war in 1990, spearheaded by the rock-pop duo Soap Kills. Various rock and alternative rock bands such as Adonis, Meen and Mashrou' Leila are also gaining in popularity. New indie artists such as IJK (singer songwriter) are also increasingly recording in the West and releasing materials in English.

Lebanese record labels

Baidaphon is a Lebanese record company, established by the Baida family in the 20th century.
It was founded in Berlin, where Michel Baida alongside his two cousins Butrus, Jibran, and Farajallah, a Lebanese recording artist, had sealed a business deal with a German company. 
Baidaphon recordings were made in Berlin and were then marketed and sold in Beirut. With the help of European engineers, the label began recording in Lebanon in 1907. By the mid-20s Baidaphon had offices across the Arab world, becoming a Middle Eastern record company. Mail-order businesses, located in Berlin, sold items to European markets and reached North and South American markets as well. In the early 1930s, the partners split apart after the death of Butrus Baida. The Egyptian singer and composer Mohammed Abdel Wahab became the new partner and helped transform the Egyptian branch of the company, by naming it “Cairophone Records” in the 1940s. Meanwhile, Baidaphon had expanded its influence in the Levant and North African regions.

Forward Music is an independent record label, established in 2001, by Carol Mansour and Ghazi Abdel Baki. It is based in Lebanon and specializes in World Music. Their goal is to gather young artists from The Middle East in hopes of finding new and creative musical dialects by combining the rich musical past of the Arab world with contemporary influences. “Al Muwashahat”, one of Forward Music’s project, received the BBC Awards for world music back in 2007.

Instruments of Lebanon

Lute (Oud/ud)
The lute is a word which comes from the Spanish laud, which came from the Arabic word for the instrument, al-ud (meaning the branch of a tree). The lute is shaped like a half pear with a short fretted neck.

Mijwiz
The mijwiz, which literally means "double" in Arabic, is a very popular instrument used in Lebanese music. It is a type of reed clarinet. It is played by breathing smoothly through a circular aperture at the end and by moving the fingers over the holes down the front of the tube in order to create the different notes. The minjjayrah is similar to the mijwiz, an open ended reed flute played in the same style. It is very popular among mountain villagers of Lebanon.

Tablah
The tablah is a small hand-drum, also known as the durbakke. Most tablahs are beautifully decorated, some with wood, tile or bone inlay, etched metal, or paintings in designs typical of the Near East. One of the most commonly played percussion instrument, the tablah is a membranophone of goat or fish skin stretched over a vase-shaped drum with a wide neck. Usually made of earthenware or metal, it is placed either under the left arm or between the legs and struck in the middle for the strong beats and on the edge for the sharp in-between beats.

Daf
The daf, also known as the rikk, is a popular instrument corresponding to the tambourine. It consists of a round frame, covered on one side with goat or fish skin. Pairs of metal discs are set into the frame to produce the jingle when struck by the hand. The sounds of this percussion instrument sets the rhythm of a lot of Arab music, particularly in classical performances.

Buzuq
The origin of the word buzuq is debated but boils down to Turkish & Persian. The buzuq, which is an essential instrument in the Rahbani repertoire, is a hybrid instrument that is not classified among the classical instruments of Arab music or among those of Turkish music. However, this instrument may be looked upon as a larger and deeper-toned relative of the Turkish saz, to which it could be compared in the same way that the viola is compared to the violin in Western music. Before the Rahbanis popularized the use of this instrument, the buzaq had been associated with the gypsy music of Lebanon. A long-necked fretted string instrument, the buzuq is furnished with two metal strings which are played with a plectrum. Famous Lebanese players of this instrument are Zaki Nassif, Philemon Wehbe, The Rahbani Brothers, Romeo Lahoud, Walid Gholmieh, and Boghos Gelalian.

Qanun 

The qanun, kanun, ganoun or kanoon is a string instrument played either solo, or more often as part of an ensemble. Qanun is played on the lap while sitting or squatting, or sometimes on trestle support, by plucking the strings with two tortoise-shell picks (one for each hand) or with fingernails, and has a standard range of three and a half octaves from A2 to E6 that can be extended down to F2 and up to G6 in the case of Arabic designs

See also
 Culture of Lebanon
 Popular culture of Lebanon
Chalga
Pop-folk
Arabic music
Arabic pop music
Mizrahi music
Laiko
Coma Dance Festival

References

Notes

Badley, Bill and Zein al Jundi. "Europe Meets Asia". 2000.  In Broughton, Simon and Ellingham, Mark with McConnachie, James and Duane, Orla (Ed.), World Music, Vol. 1: Africa, Europe and the Middle East, pp 391–395. Rough Guides Ltd, Penguin Books.

External links
 The Official Lebanese Top 20. Compiled by Ipsos.
 Baidaphon (Lebanon).
 Baidaphon.
 Baidaphon Records is a Lebanese label.
 Baidaphon. Source by Discogs
 Cairophon. 
 The House Of Arab World Music. 
 World Music from Lebanon. Written by Ghazi Abdel Baki
 Forward Music. Last edited on 27 April 2020

Lebanese music